The 2012 St. John's Red Storm baseball team represented St. John's University in the 2012 NCAA Division I baseball season.  The Red Storm were coached by seventeenth year head coach Ed Blankmeyer and played their home games at Jack Kaiser Stadium.

St. John's claimed the Big East Conference regular season and Tournament championships, and also swept through the Chapel Hill Regional.  The Red Storm fell to eventual champion Arizona in the Tucson Super Regional, by scores of 7–6 (10 innings) and 7–4.

Roster

Rankings

References

St. John's Red Storm baseball seasons
St. John's Red Storm
Big East Conference baseball champion seasons
St. John's Red Storm baseball
St. John's